Domenico "Mimmo" Jodice (born 24 March 1934, in Naples) is an Italian photographer. He was professor at the Accademia di Belle Arti di Napoli from 1970 to 1996.

Life and career
Since the 1960s Jodice worked with many artists of various styles like Pop art, Arte Povera or Fluxus. As a documentary photographer of conceptual art Jodice made photographs of artists, e.g. Andy Warhol, Joseph Beuys oder Robert Rauschenberg. Later he focussed on landscape, and sceneries. In that field Jodice became one of the significant Italian photographers. Jodice dealt mainly with Italian landscapes and cities, using exclusively black-and-white films. Jodice worked on the concept of time, connecting the old and the new, such as run-down monuments and views of modern cities. An example is the series LOST IN SEEING. Dreams and Visions of Italy, whose effect is described by the essayist Alessandro Mauro as follows: "In Jodice’s work silence takes over places and the photographs become metaphysical visions, an interweaving of the signs of the past as they return to inhabit the present". Very well known are the views on Jodice's home town Naples, for example the series Naples: une archéologie future.

Exhibitions
Among many exhibitions worldwide, Jodice's works are exhibited at the Aperture Foundation in New York, the Philadelphia Museum of Art, the San Francisco Museum of Modern Art, the Maison Européenne de la Photographie in Paris or the Museo d'Arte Contemporanea in Turin.

Awards
Jodice won the Feltrinelli Prize (photography) in 2003.

Further reading
 Mediterranea / Mimmo Jodice. Essays von George Hersey and Predrag Matvejevic. Knesebeck, Munich 1997.

External links
 Exhibitions of Mimmo Jodice
 Giornale Nuovo about Mimmo Jodice
 Books by Mimmo Jodice

References

Photographers from Naples
Italian contemporary artists
Italian photographers
1934 births
Pop artists
Living people
Academic staff of the Accademia di Belle Arti di Napoli